"What Are We Doin' in Love" is a song written by Randy Goodrum and recorded by American country music artist Dottie West. Although not credited on the single release, the song also features American country and pop recording artist Kenny Rogers. It was released in March 1981 as the second single from the album Wild West. The song was West and Rogers' third and final number one on the country chart.

Background
Since 1978, West and Rogers had been together as a duet partnership. Rogers revived the career of Dottie West when their song "Every Time Fools Collide" became a hit in 1978. They became one of the most successful duet partnerships since then. However, in 1980, both went their separate ways to become solo artists again. The song was Dottie West's only top 40 hit after a few modestly charting solo records on the Billboard Hot 100. The single proved to be the final Rogers and West recorded duet, although they did occasionally perform together in later years on stage.

Charts

Weekly charts
"What Are We Doin' in Love" became a crossover hit for the two, reaching number 14 on the Top 40 as well as number 7 on the Adult Contemporary charts.

Year-end charts

References

1981 singles
1981 songs
Kenny Rogers songs
Dottie West songs
Male–female vocal duets
Songs written by Randy Goodrum
Liberty Records singles
Song recordings produced by Brent Maher